The 2018–19 I liga (currently named Fortuna I liga due to sponsorship reasons) was the 11th season of the Polish I liga under its current title, and the 71st season of the second highest division in the Polish football league system since its establishment in 1949. The league was operated by the PZPN. The league was contested by 18 teams. The season was played in a round-robin tournament. The season started on 20 July 2018 and will conclude on 19 May 2019.

Changes from last season
The following teams have changed division since the 2017–18 season.

To I liga
Relegated from Ekstraklasa
 Bruk-Bet Termalica Nieciecza
 Sandecja Nowy Sącz
Promoted from II liga
 GKS Jastrzębie
 ŁKS Łódź
 Warta Poznań
 Garbarnia Kraków

From I liga
Promoted to Ekstraklasa
 Miedź Legnica
 Zagłębie Sosnowiec
Relegated to II liga
 Pogoń Siedlce
 Górnik Łęczna
 Olimpia Grudziądz
 Ruch Chorzów

Team overview

Stadiums and locations

 Garbarnia Kraków played their home games in Stadion im. Henryka Reymana until their home ground (Stadion Garbarni) fulfills license requirements.

League table

Positions by round

Results

Results by round

Top goalscorers

Attendances

See also
 2018–19 Ekstraklasa
 2018–19 Polish Cup

Notes

References

External link
 

2018–19 in Polish football
Poland
I liga seasons